KTFC may refer to:

 KTFC (FM), a radio station (103.3 FM) licensed to Sioux City, Iowa, United States
 Kendal Town F.C.
 Kettering Town F.C.